An Urinometer is a simple piece of equipment for determining urine specific gravity.

A typical urinometer is composed of a float, a weight, and a stem. The float is an air-filled glass tube, ending in the weight on the left and the stem on the right. The weight is a bulb filled with ball bearings embedded in a red solid, probably a glue of some sort. The glass stem extends to the right, and has calibrated graduations and numbers marked off to indicate specific gravity measurements.

It is placed in a tube of urine, and where the meniscus of the urine reaches displays the specific gravity of the urine.

An urinometer is typically used in medical diagnostic labs.

See also
 Urinalysis

References 

Urine